Hidden Fires may refer to:

 Hidden Fires (1918 film), American film directed by George Irving
 Hidden Fires (1925 film), German film directed by Einar Bruun